The Afghan vole (Microtus afghanus) is a species of rodent in the family Cricetidae. It is found in south-central Asia.

Characteristics

The Afghan vole has a small, stocky body, a blunt, rounded muzzle and rounded ears. The colour varies across its range from pale-yellow-ochre to grayish-yellow. The short tail is a similar colour and the underparts are creamy gray. A diploid set of chromosomes (2n=58) is characteristic of this species. The length of the body is 110 millimetres with a tail of 30 millimetres. The foot is 16 millimetres long and usually has six sole pads though there are occasionally five.

Distribution

This species is widely distributed in semi-desert, steppes and mountainous areas of southern Turkmenistan, southern Uzbekistan, northeastern Iran, Tajikistan and central Afghanistan, where it has been recorded at up to 3,400 metres. In most of its distribution area it lives at heights of 500–600 metres above sea level but occasionally up to 1700 metres.

Ecology

This vole favours fallow and dry lands, rough grassland and scrub. It mainly eats the green parts of plants but also feeds on seeds, fruits, flowers and roots. It stores food supplies of up to 4.5 kilograms for winter use. It is a colonial species and forms complex burrows. These can cover as much as 180 square metres with the number of entrance holes varying from 20 to 145 and number of voles from four to ten individuals. Reproduction occurs in the autumn, winter and spring with a pause during summer drought. Litter sizes vary from one to ten and in some years, population sizes can increase substantially.

References

Rodents of Asia
Mammals of Afghanistan
Mammals described in 1912
Taxa named by Oldfield Thomas
Taxonomy articles created by Polbot
Microtus
Taxobox binomials not recognized by IUCN